John Bernard Karrs (September 19, 1915 – November 27, 1999) was an American football quarterback who played for the Cleveland Rams in the National Football League (NFL). He played college football at Duquesne University.

He was also one of the first left-handed quarterbacks in the history of the NFL.

Coaching career 
Karrs was a sports coach for several high school teams. He was primarily a coach at Penn High for years. In 1944, he was going to accept a new job at Waynesboro High School but ended up backing out shortly after and remaining a coach at Penn High. However, he was on the hot seat and had an option to either coach at Penn High, or play a season with the Cleveland Rams. He ended up choosing to play with the Rams and was no longer a coach at Penn High.

Professional career 
Despite not playing football for six seasons prior, Karrs signed with the Cleveland Rams in 1944. Playing in all ten games of the season and starting in eight, he threw four completions for 49 yards with a 23-yard pass being his longest of the season. He also rushed seven times for 0 total yards with his longest run being 3 yards.

Karrs was still on the Rams in the 1945 offseason but got involved in a 2-for-1 trade that put him on the Pittsburgh Steelers two weeks before the preseason began. He did not play an NFL game with the Steelers.

References 

1915 births
1999 deaths
American football quarterbacks
Duquesne Dukes football players
Los Angeles Rams players
Pittsburgh Steelers players